C'est pas tout à fait la vie dont j'avais rêvé is a 2005 French drama film directed by Michel Piccoli. It was screened out of competition at the 2005 Cannes Film Festival.

Cast
 Roger Jendly - Le mari
 Michèle Gleizer - La femme
 Elisabeth Margoni - La maîtresse
 Monique Éberlé - La gouvernante
 Nicolas Barbot - Le petit garçon

References

External links

2005 films
French drama films
2000s French-language films
2005 drama films
Films directed by Michel Piccoli
Films produced by Paulo Branco
2000s French films